Bobby Ross (born 1936) is an American former football coach.

Bobby Ross may also refer to:

 Bobby Ross (footballer, born 1917) (1917–1994), Scottish footballer
 Bobby Ross (footballer, born 1925) (1925–1984), Scottish footballer (Dundee United)
 Bobby Ross (footballer, born 1941), Scottish football midfielder
 Bobby Ross (footballer, born 1942), Scottish football midfielder
 Bobby Ross (rugby union) (born 1969), former Canadian national rugby player

See also 
 Bob Ross (disambiguation)
 Robert Ross (disambiguation)